Kermia albicaudata is a species of sea snail, a marine gastropod mollusk in the family Raphitomidae.

Description
The length of the shell attains 4 mm, its diameter 1½ mm.

The oval shell is acuminate. The contrast of colour, the chief portion of the shell being a rich brown, with the  protoconch and lower part of the body whorl white, is very remarkable. The shell contains in total seven whorls. The 2 - 3 whorls in the protoconch are finely reticulate. The other whorls are convex. The suture is not very impressed. The reticulate sculpture consists of about 12 longitudinal ribs and 3 - 4 spiral lirae that form small, glossy nodules with the ribs. The body whorl shows 12 spiral lirae of which the lower six show a granular white colour. The aperture measures slightly less than half the length of the shell. The outer lip is very thick and denticulate within with 4 - 5 teeth. The sinus is not very deep and located near the suture. The siphonal canal is short.

Distribution
This species occurs  in the Persian Gulf.

References

External links
 
 Kazmi, Quddusi B., M. Moazzam, and Razia Sultana. "Marine Molluscan fauna Of the Pakistani coastal waters."

albicaudata
Gastropods described in 1882